Tokyo Tales is the first live album by German metal band Blind Guardian. It was remastered and re-released on 15 June 2007, with the same Japanese bonus track.

Track listing 

 "Inquisition" – 0:47
 "Banish from Sanctuary" – 6:03
 "Journey Through the Dark" – 5:12
 "Traveler in Time" – 6:32
 "The Quest for Tanelorn" – 6:03
 "Goodbye My Friend" – 6:28
 "Time What is Time" – 6:42
 "Majesty" – 7:48
 "Valhalla" – 6:08
 "Welcome to Dying" – 5:56
 "Lord of the Rings" (Japanese/2007 re-release bonus track) – 3:52
 "Lost in the Twilight Hall" – 7:26
 "Barbara Ann" – 2:56

Personnel

Blind Guardian

 Hansi Kürsch – vocals and bass
 André Olbrich – lead guitar and backing vocals
 Marcus Siepen – rhythm guitar and backing vocals
 Thomas "Thomen" Stauch – drums

Guest musicians
 Marc Zee – keyboards and backing vocals

Crew
 Thomas "Länglich" Nisch - stage manager
 Sascha Wischnewsky - merchandising
 Dirkie Busche - guitars
 Daniel Kleckers - drums
 Kalle Trapp - production, sound
 Henry Klaere - tour manager
 Jogi Cappel - lighting
 Buffo Schnädelbach - photos
 Piet Sielck - second engineer

References

Blind Guardian albums
1993 live albums